Modig may refer to:
Modig, Iran (disambiguation), places in Iran
Aron Modig (born 1985), Swedish politician
Einar Modig (1883–1960), Swedish diplomat
Johan Modig (born 1977), Swedish orienteering competitor
Mattias Modig (born 1987), Swedish ice hockey player